Trostenets is a rural locality (a selo) and the administrative center of Trostenetskoye Rural Settlement, Novooskolsky District, Belgorod Oblast, Russia. The population was 845 as of 2010. There are 15 streets.

Geography 
Trostenets is located 24 km northwest of Novy Oskol (the district's administrative centre) by road. Kiselevka is the nearest rural locality.

References 

Rural localities in Novooskolsky District